Demetrius of Rostov (secular name Daniil Savvich Tuptalo, or Tuptalenko, according to some sources; 11 December 1651 28 October 1709) was a leading opponent of the Caesaropapist reform of the Russian Orthodox church promoted by Theophan Prokopovich. He is representative of the strong Cossack Baroque influence upon the Russian Orthodox Church at the turn of the 17th and 18th centuries.

Demetrius is sometimes credited as composer or compiler of the first Russian opera, the lengthy Rostov Mysteries of 1705, though the exact nature of this work, as well as its place in history, is open to debate.

He is the author of several written works, out of which the most famous is The Lives of Saints (Четьи-Минеи).

Life
He was born into a Cossack family in 1651. Soon thereafter his family moved to Kiev, and he entered the Kievo-Mohyla Academy at the age of 11. On 9 July 1668 he took his religious vows at St. Cyril's Monastery in Kiev and was given the monastic name of Demetrius (after Saint Demetrius of Thessalonika). After a brief period in Chernigov, Demetrius went to venerate the Byzantine Slavic Christian shrines of Belarus (at the time property of the Byzantine Rite Belarusian and Ukrainian Catholic metropolitans of the Uniate churches), still located in the Polish–Lithuanian Commonwealth at that time. In 1678 he returned from Vilno to Baturyn and settled at the court of the hetman Ivan Samoylovych.

During the 1680s, Demetrius lived mostly at the Kiev Pechersk Lavra, while his sermons against hard drinking and lax morals made his name known all over Russia. He was appointed hegumen (superior) of several major monasteries of Ukraine, but concentrated his attention upon the ambitious project of integrating all the lives of Russian saints into a single work, which he published as Monthly Readings (Четьи-минеи) or Menologion in 1684-1705. He also found time to study ecclesiastical history of the Russian Orthodox Church.

In 1701 Demetrius was appointed Metropolitan of Siberia but, pleading ill health, preferred to stay in Moscow until he was invested with the archbishopric of Rostov. During his life in Russia, Demetrius opposed both the Old Believers' and Peter the Great's ecclesiastical policies, gradually drifting towards the party of Eudoxia Lopukhina and Tsarevich Alexis. Shortly before his death he forged a document to undermine the Old Believers by portraying them as adherents of heresy. He also made invaluable contributions to the Russian education, opening a school and a small theatre in Rostov, where his own plays could be staged.

Work as composer

Demetrius was also active as a composer, although his musical education is undocumented aside from the standard music curriculum established by Feofan Prokopovich at the Kyiv-Mohyla Academy. Many of his Penitential Psalms achieved wide circulation, not only in the Ukraine but in the Balkans too, and many have become an integral part of Ukrainian folk-song tradition through the kobzari, itinerant blind singers.

Demetrius is credited as composer or compiler of the first Russian opera, the six-hour-long Rostov Mysteries of 1705. Though this has been staged, notably by Boris Pokrovsky's Moscow Chamber Musical Theatre, in Moscow and at the Brighton Festival (1993), it may best be judged an oratorio on the lives of Russian saints. Its basis is the "Cheti-Minei" (Четьи-Минеи), published in four volumes in 1689, 1690, 1700 and 1705 — the same source that inspired Pushkin in 1825 to write Boris Godunov.

Death

Upon Demetrius' death, on 28 October 1709, his relics were placed at St. Jacob's Monastery, which his followers would rebuild as Demetrius' shrine. A fortress on the Don River was named after him; today it is known as Rostov-on-the-Don.

References

External links

 Chrysostom Press Translations of St Demetrius' Lives of the Saints
 Repose of St Demetrius, Metropolitan of Rostov Orthodox icon and synaxarion
 
 Uncovering of the relics of St Demetrius the Metropolitan of Rostov icon and synaxarion
 Prelate Demetrius of Rostov www.fatheralexander.org

Christian writers
18th-century Eastern Orthodox archbishops
Ukrainian Orthodox bishops
Russian saints of the Eastern Orthodox Church
Eastern Orthodox saints from Ukraine
National University of Kyiv-Mohyla Academy alumni
1651 births
1709 deaths
18th-century Christian saints
Russian Orthodox Christians from Ukraine